Daniel Missaki  (born April 9, 1996) is a Brazilian professional baseball pitcher for the Yomiuri Giants of Nippon Professional Baseball (NPB). He has previously played in the Baseball Challenge League for the Tochigi Golden Braves.

Career

Seattle Mariners
Missaki represented Brazil at the 2013 World Baseball Classic, and was the youngest player in the tournament, at just 16 years old. Following the tournament, on June 19, 2013, Missaki signed as an international free agent with the Seattle Mariners.

After signing with Seattle, Missaki made his professional debut that season with the AZL Brewers, going 0-1 with a 6.23 ERA in 13 innings pitched. In 2014, he played with the Pulaski Mariners where he pitched to a 6-3 record and a 2.76 ERA in 11 starts, and in 2015, Missaki pitched for the Clinton LumberKings. On May 1, 2015, Missaki and two relievers combined on a no-hitter for the LumberKings against the Cedar Rapids Kernels. Later that month, he underwent Tommy John surgery that ended his season.  In six starts prior to the surgery, he was 1-2 with a 3.41 ERA.

Milwaukee Brewers
Following the 2015 season, the Mariners traded Missaki, Carlos Herrera, and Freddy Peralta to the Milwaukee Brewers for Adam Lind. He missed both the 2016 and 2017 seasons after having another Tommy John surgery. In 2018, despite making a couple of appearances in spring training, Missaki did not pitch in a regular season game. He was released from the Brewers organization on September 18, 2018.

Tochigi Golden Braves
Missaki signed with the Tochigi Golden Braves of Baseball Challenge League on April 10, 2020.

Yomiuri Giants
On August 17, 2021, Missaki signed with the Yomiuri Giants of the Nippon Professional Baseball (NPB) as a developmental squad player(:ja:育成選手制度 (日本プロ野球)) for forty thousand dollars.

International career
He was selected for Brazil national baseball team at the 2013 World Baseball Classic Qualification, 2013 World Baseball Classic, 2019 Pan American Games Qualifier, and 2021 World Baseball Classic Qualifier.

References

External links

Baseball America
 Career statistics - NPB.jp

1996 births
Living people
Arizona League Mariners players
Brazilian expatriate baseball players in the United States
Brazilian expatriates in Japan
Brazilian people of Japanese descent
Baseball pitchers
Clinton LumberKings players
Nippon Professional Baseball pitchers
Pulaski Mariners players
Sportspeople from Shizuoka Prefecture
2013 World Baseball Classic players
Yomiuri Giants players